The 2008 Seniors Torneo Godó was the third edition of the Seniors Torneo Godó and it took place from April 24–28, 2008.

Tie-breaks were used for the first two sets of each match, which was the best of three sets. If the score was tied at one set all, a "champions tie break" (the first player to win at least 10 points or by a margin of two points) would be used.

Sergi Bruguera was the defending champion, but had to withdraw (due to an injury) before his 3rd match of the round robin.

Marcelo Ríos won the title by defeating Michael Stich 6–3, 6–3 in the final. Cédric Pioline took the third place.

Draw
The main draw was announced on 23 April.

Group stage

Group A

Group B

Bruguera had to withdraw before his match against Ríos due to an injury in his right knee.

Final four

Third-place playoff

Final

Exhibition match

References

External links
 Official Results Archive of the 2008 season (ATP) (Downloadable PDF file. Barcelona appears in page 7)

Seniors